The Obsessed of Catule is a 1965 Brazilian drama film directed by Anselmo Duarte. It was entered into the 15th Berlin International Film Festival.

Cast
 Raul Cortez as Joaquim
 José Parisi as Manuel
 Esther Mellinger as Artuliana
 Lélia Abramo as Dolor
 Margarida Cardoso 
 Maria Isabel de Lizandra as Ana
 José Pereira as Onofre
 Áurea Campos as Germana

References

External links

1965 drama films
1965 films
1960s Portuguese-language films
Brazilian black-and-white films
Brazilian drama films
Films directed by Anselmo Duarte